Lago di Fimon is a lake in the Province of Vicenza, Veneto, Italy. Its surface area is 0.51 km².

Lakes of Veneto